The Pittsburgh Tax Review is a journal of legal scholarship published by an independent student group  at University of Pittsburgh School of Law. The Pittsburgh Tax Review has repeatedly been ranked among the top tax journals in the United States. The only journal at the University of Pittsburgh School of Law that is peer-reviewed, the Pittsburgh Tax Review publishes  twice yearly and highlights articles by professors and practitioners in the field of taxation, as well as student notes and articles that exhibit exemplary insight into the field of taxation. The journal began publication in 2003. This journal provides immediate open access to its content.

References

External links

American law journals
University of Pittsburgh student publications
Academic journals published by university libraries
Academic journals edited by students
Tax law journals
Publications established in 2003
Law journals edited by students